Józef Zaliwski of Junosza coat of arms (22 March 1797 in Marijampolė or Jurbarkas – 1 April 1855 in Paris) was a Polish pułkownik of Kingdom of Poland and independence activist.

Zaliwski was a member of Wolnomularstwo Narodowe, Walerian Łukasiński's Towarzystwo Patriotyczne, Piotr Wysocki Conspiracy (Sprzysiężenie Wysockiego), co-organiser (with Joachim Lelewel) of Zemsta Ludu (1832), initiator of guerilla warfare (1833). He participated in November Uprising (1830–1831).

References
 
 

1797 births
1855 deaths
People from Marijampolė
November Uprising participants
Activists of the Great Emigration